Biodiversity and Conservation is a peer-reviewed scientific journal covering all aspects of biological diversity, its conservation, and sustainable use. It was established in 1992 and is published by Springer Science+Business Media.

Abstracting and indexing
The journal is abstracted and indexed in:
AGRICOLA
BIOSIS Previews
Biological Abstracts
CAB Abstracts
According to the Journal Citation Reports, the journal has a 2021 impact factor of 4.296.

References

External links

English-language journals
Publications with year of establishment missing
Springer Science+Business Media academic journals
Conservation biology
Ecology journals